Argentina competed at the 2022 World Games held in Birmingham, United States from 7 to 17 July 2022. Athletes representing Argentina won one silver medal and two bronze medals. The country finished in 57th place in the medal table.

Medalists

Competitors
The following is the list of number of competitors in the Games:

Beach handball

Argentina won one bronze medal in beach handball.

Men

Women

Boules sports

Argentina competed in boules sports.

Canoe marathon

Argentina competed in canoe marathon.

Cue sports

Argentina competed in cue sports.

Fistball

Argentina competed in fistball.

Racquetball

Argentina competed in racquetball.

Roller skating

Artistic

Argentina competed in artistic roller skating.

Road

Argentina competed in road speed skating.

Track

Argentina competed in track speed skating.

Men

Women

Squash

Argentina competed in squash.

Sumo

Argentina competed in sumo.

Trampoline gymnastics

Argentina competed in trampoline gymnastics.

Water skiing

Argentina won two medals in water skiing.

Men

Women

Wushu

Argentina competed in wushu.

References

Nations at the 2022 World Games
2022
World Games